Lu Wan (died 194 BC) was a Chinese military general, monarch, and politician that served as the vassal king of the early Han dynasty. He served under Liu Bang (Emperor Gaozu), the founding emperor of the Han dynasty.

Early life 
Lu Wan was from Feng Town, which is in present-day Feng County, Jiangsu. His father and Liu Bang's father were close friends, as were Liu Bang and him. He shared the same birthday as Liu Bang and studied in the same school as him.

Around 209 BC, when Liu Bang rebelled against the Qin dynasty, Lu Wan supported him in the rebellion. After the collapse of the Qin dynasty in 206 BC, Xiang Yu, the de facto leader of the rebel forces that overthrew Qin, divided the former Qin Empire into the Eighteen Kingdoms, each ruled by a king who nominally paid allegiance to Emperor Yi of Chu, the puppet monarch he controlled. Liu Bang became the King of Han and was given Hanzhong and the Bashu region (present-day Sichuan and Chongqing) as his domain. He appointed Lu Wan as a General and Palace Attendant. Later on, when Liu Bang engaged Xiang Yu in a power struggle – historically known as the Chu–Han Contention (206–202 BC) – for supremacy over China, Lu Wan accompanied Liu Bang into battle as a Grand Commandant. Because of his close friendship with Liu Bang, he received many gifts from Liu Bang and was allowed to enter Liu Bang's living quarters freely. Even Liu Bang's other close aides, including Xiao He and Cao Shen, did not receive the same level of treatment from their lord as Lu Wan. Liu Bang also gave Lu Wan a title of nobility – Marquis of Chang'an.

Service under the Han dynasty 
In the winter of 202 BC, after Liu Bang defeated Xiang Yu at the Battle of Gaixia, he ordered Lu Wan and Liu Jia to lead troops to attack Gong Wei, the King of Linjiang. Lu Wan and Liu Jia defeated Gong Wei, conquered Linjiang, and returned by the seventh lunar month of the following year. Lu Wan later followed Liu Bang to attack Zang Tu, the King of Yan, whom they defeated. By then, Liu Bang had unified most – if not all – of the former Eighteen Kingdoms under his control and established the Han Empire with himself as its first emperor; he is historically known as Emperor Gaozu of the Han dynasty. Although Liu Bang had already awarded vassal king titles to seven men who were not from his own clan, he wanted to make Lu Wan a vassal king as well so he sought his subjects' opinions. Liu Bang's subjects were well aware of Lu Wan's close relationship with the emperor, so they nominated Lu Wan on the grounds that he had made great contributions in the battles against the rival kingdoms. In the eighth lunar month of 202, Lu Wan was formally created King of Yan.

Secretly contacting Chen Xi and the Xiongnu 
In the autumn of 197 BC, Chen Xi started a rebellion and declared himself the King of Dai. Emperor Gaozu personally led an army to suppress the rebellion, while Lu Wan led another army to help the emperor by attacking Chen Xi from the northeast. Chen Xi sent Wang Huang as a messenger to seek help from the Xiongnu; Lu Wan also sent his subordinate, Zhang Sheng, to meet the Xiongnu and spread news that Chen Xi was going to be defeated, and urge the Xiongnu to refrain from helping him. On his way to Xiongnu territory, Zhang Sheng met Zang Yan, Zang Tu's son, who was living in exile. Zang Yan told him that the Kingdom of Yan was able to remain stable and continue its existence because the Han central government was occupied with suppressing the rebellions. He further explained that as long as there was conflict, Yan would continue to serve a useful function: to help the Han central government fight opposing forces. If conflict ceased, Yan would lose its purpose and might end up like the other vassal kingdoms which had already been dismantled (and their rulers were killed, some on false charges of treason). Zhang Sheng heeded Zang Yan's advice to secretly arrange with the Xiongnu to help Chen Xi attack the Kingdom of Yan. When Lu Wan heard that Zhang Sheng was plotting with the Xiongnu to attack his domain, he wrote a memorial to Emperor Gaozu to seek permission to have Zhang Sheng's family executed because Zhang committed treason. However, after Zhang Sheng returned and explained everything to him, Lu Wan realised his folly and spared Zhang Sheng's family. He then sent Zhang Sheng to continue to remain in contact with the Xiongnu, and sent Fan Qi to contact Chen Xi and secretly arrange to help Chen Xi prolong the survival of his rebel regime.

Emperor Gaozu's suspicions towards Lu Wan 
In 195 BC, Emperor Gaozu led an army to attack Ying Bu, a vassal king who had rebelled against him. At the same time, he ordered Fan Kuai to lead another army to attack Chen Xi. One of Chen Xi's subordinates who surrendered to Fan Kuai revealed that Fan Qi, Lu Wan's subordinate, had been secretly maintaining contact with Chen Xi. Emperor Gaozu became suspicious of Lu Wan so he summoned Lu Wan to the capital for questioning, but Lu Wan claimed that he was ill. The emperor then sent Shen Yiji and Zhao Yao to fetch Lu Wan to the capital and conduct an investigation in the Kingdom of Yan. Lu Wan became very fearful when heard about it so he pretended to be ill and confined himself at home and refused to meet Shen Yiji and Zhao Yao. He told his close aides, "Of all the vassal kings not from the imperial clan, only Wu Chen and I are left. Hán Xin and Peng Yue lost their lives because of Empress Lü. His Majesty is ill and has entrusted all state affairs to the Empress. The Empress is seeking excuses to eliminate all the non-imperial clan nobles and subjects who have made great contributions." He continued to pretend to be sick. When Shen Yiji returned to the capital, he reported to Emperor Gaozu what Lu Wan said to his aides. The emperor was furious. Later, after learning from Xiongnu prisoners-of-war that Lu Wan had sent Zhang Sheng to contact the Xiongnu, Emperor Gaozu became angrier and more convinced that Lu Wan was plotting a rebellion.

Death 
In the second lunar month of 195 BC, Emperor Gaozu ordered Fan Kuai to lead an army to attack Lu Wan. Lu Wan gathered all his family members and subordinates, numbering a few thousand people in total, escaped from the Kingdom of Yan, and settled down at a location near the Great Wall. He planned to turn himself in to Emperor Gaozu and plead for forgiveness after the emperor had recovered from his illness. However, Emperor Gaozu died two months later before Lu Wan could do so. When Lu Wan received news of Emperor Gaozu's death, he gathered his family and subordinates and fled to Xiongnu territory. The Xiongnu gave him the title of King Lu of Donghu. While living in exile, Lu Wan was often attacked and robbed by the barbarians, and he often thought of returning home. He died a year later in exile.

Family and descendants
When Empress Lü ruled the Han Empire as regent after Emperor Gaozu's death, Lu Wan's family members managed to return to Han territory. They wanted to meet her but she died of illness before they could meet. Lu Wan's widow also died of illness not long later.

In 144 BC, Lu Wan's grandson, Lu Tazhi, who had inherited the title of King of Donghu, surrendered to the Han Empire and was enfeoffed as the Marquis of Yagu.

References

Citations

Bibliography
 Sima Qian et al. Records of the Grand Historian (Shiji).
 Ban Gu et al. Book of Han, Volume 34.

194 BC deaths
Chinese princes
Chu–Han contention people
Donghu people
Han dynasty generals from Jiangsu
Han dynasty politicians from Jiangsu
Politicians from Xuzhou
Xiongnu
Year of birth unknown